Neoconservatism is a political movement that began in the United States during the 1960s among liberal hawks who became disenchanted with the increasingly pacifist foreign policy of the Democratic Party and with the growing New Left and counterculture of the 1960s, particularly the Vietnam protests. Some also began to question their liberal beliefs regarding domestic policies such as the Great Society. Neoconservatives typically advocate the promotion of democracy and interventionism in international affairs, including peace through strength, and are known for espousing disdain for communism and political radicalism.

Many of adherents of neoconservatism became politically influential during the Republican presidential administrations of the 1970s, 1980s, 1990s and 2000s, peaking in influence during the administration of George W. Bush, when they played a major role in promoting and planning the 2003 invasion of Iraq. Prominent neoconservatives in the George W. Bush administration included Paul Wolfowitz, Elliott Abrams, Richard Perle and Paul Bremer. While not identifying as neoconservatives, senior officials Vice President Dick Cheney and Secretary of Defense Donald Rumsfeld listened closely to neoconservative advisers regarding foreign policy, especially the defense of Israel and the promotion of American influence in the Middle East.

Critics of neoconservatism have used the term to describe foreign policy and war hawks who support aggressive militarism or neo-imperialism. Historically speaking, the term neoconservative refers to those who made the ideological journey from the anti-Stalinist left to the camp of American conservatism during the 1960s and 1970s. The movement had its intellectual roots in the  magazine Commentary, edited by Norman Podhoretz. They spoke out against the New Left, and in that way helped define the movement.

Terminology 

The term neoconservative was popularized in the United States during 1973 by the socialist leader Michael Harrington, who used the term to define Daniel Bell, Daniel Patrick Moynihan, and Irving Kristol, whose ideologies differed from Harrington's.

The neoconservative label was used by Irving Kristol in his 1979 article "Confessions of a True, Self-Confessed 'Neoconservative'". His ideas have been influential since the 1950s, when he co-founded and edited the magazine Encounter.

Another source was Norman Podhoretz, editor of the magazine Commentary, from 1960 to 1995. By 1982, Podhoretz was terming himself a neoconservative in The New York Times Magazine article titled "The Neoconservative Anguish over Reagan's Foreign Policy".

During the late 1970s and early 1980s, the neoconservatives considered that liberalism had failed and "no longer knew what it was talking about", according to E. J. Dionne.

Seymour Lipset asserts that the term neoconservative was used originally by socialists to criticize the politics of the Social Democrats, USA association. Jonah Goldberg argues that the term is ideological criticism against proponents of modern American liberalism who had become slightly more conservative (both Lipset and Goldberg are frequently described as neoconservatives). In a book-length study for Harvard University Press, historian Justin Vaisse writes that Lipset and Goldberg are in error, as "neoconservative" was used by socialist Michael Harrington to describe three men – noted above – who were not in SDUSA, and neoconservatism is a definable political movement.

The term "neoconservative" was the subject of increased media coverage during the presidency of George W. Bush, with particular emphasis on a perceived neoconservative influence on American foreign policy, as part of the Bush Doctrine.

History 

Through the 1950s and early 1960s, the future neoconservatives had endorsed the civil rights movement, racial integration and Martin Luther King Jr. From the 1950s to the 1960s, liberals generally endorsed military action in order to prevent a communist victory in Vietnam.

Neoconservatism was initiated by the repudiation of the Cold War and the "New Politics" of the American New Left, which Norman Podhoretz said was too sympathetic to the counterculture and too alienated from the majority of the population; and "anti-anticommunism", which included substantial endorsement of Marxist–Leninist politics during the late 1960s. Many neoconservatives were particularly alarmed by what they believed were the antisemitic sentiments of Black Power advocates. Irving Kristol edited the journal The Public Interest (1965–2005), featuring economists and political scientists, which emphasized ways that government planning in the liberal state had produced unintended harmful consequences. Many early neoconservative political figures were disillusioned Democratic politicians and intellectuals, such as Daniel Patrick Moynihan, who served in the Nixon and Ford administrations, and Jeane Kirkpatrick, who served as United States Ambassador to the United Nations in the Reagan administration. Many left-wing academics such as Frank Meyer and James Burnham eventually became associated with the conservative movement at this time.

A substantial number of neoconservatives were originally moderate socialists who were originally associated with the moderate wing of the Socialist Party of America (SP) and its successor party, Social Democrats, USA (SDUSA). Max Shachtman, a former Trotskyist theorist who developed a strong feeling of antipathy towards the New Left, had numerous devotees among SDUSA with strong links to George Meany's AFL-CIO. Following Shachtman and Meany, this faction led the SP to oppose immediate withdrawal from the Vietnam War, and oppose George McGovern in the Democratic primary race and, to some extent, the general election. They also chose to cease their own party-building and concentrated on working within the Democratic Party, eventually influencing it through the Democratic Leadership Council. Thus the Socialist Party dissolved in 1972, and SDUSA emerged that year. (Most of the left-wing of the party, led by Michael Harrington, immediately abandoned SDUSA.) SDUSA leaders associated with neoconservatism include Carl Gershman, Penn Kemble, Joshua Muravchik and Bayard Rustin.

Norman Podhoretz's magazine Commentary, originally a journal of liberalism, became a major publication for neoconservatives during the 1970s. Commentary published an article by Jeane Kirkpatrick, an early and prototypical neoconservative.

Rejecting the American New Left and McGovern's New Politics 
As the policies of the New Left made the Democrats increasingly leftist, these intellectuals became disillusioned with President Lyndon B. Johnson's Great Society domestic programs. The influential 1970 bestseller The Real Majority by Ben Wattenberg expressed that the "real majority" of the electorate endorsed economic interventionism, but also social conservatism; and warned Democrats it could be disastrous to adopt liberal positions on certain social and crime issues.

The neoconservatives rejected the countercultural New Left and what they considered anti-Americanism in the non-interventionism of the activism against the Vietnam War. After the anti-war faction took control of the party during 1972 and nominated George McGovern, the Democrats among them endorsed Washington Senator Henry "Scoop" Jackson instead for his unsuccessful 1972 and 1976 campaigns for president. Among those who worked for Jackson were incipient neoconservatives Paul Wolfowitz, Doug Feith, and Richard Perle. During the late 1970s, neoconservatives tended to endorse Ronald Reagan, the Republican who promised to confront Soviet expansionism. Neoconservatives organized in the American Enterprise Institute and The Heritage Foundation to counter the liberal establishment. Author Keith Preston named the successful effort on behalf of neoconservatives such as George Will and Irving Kristol to cancel Reagan's 1980 nomination of Mel Bradford, a Southern Paleoconservative academic whose regionalist focus and writings about Abraham Lincoln and Reconstruction alienated the more cosmopolitan and progress-oriented neoconservatives, to the leadership of the National Endowment for the Humanities in favor of longtime Democrat William Bennett as emblematic of the neoconservative movement establishing hegemony over mainstream American conservatism.

In another (2004) article, Michael Lind also wrote:

Leo Strauss and his students 
C. Bradley Thompson, a professor at Clemson University, claims that most influential neoconservatives refer explicitly to the theoretical ideas in the philosophy of Leo Strauss (1899–1973), although there are several writers who claim that in doing so they may draw upon meaning that Strauss himself did not endorse. Eugene Sheppard notes: "Much scholarship tends to understand Strauss as an inspirational founder of American neoconservatism". Strauss was a refugee from Nazi Germany who taught at the New School for Social Research in New York (1938–1948) and the University of Chicago (1949–1969).

Strauss asserted that "the crisis of the West consists in the West's having become uncertain of its purpose". His solution was a restoration of the vital ideas and faith that in the past had sustained the moral purpose of the West. The Greek classics (classical republican and modern republican), political philosophy and the Judeo-Christian heritage are the essentials of the Great Tradition in Strauss's work. Strauss emphasized the spirit of the Greek classics and Thomas G. West (1991) argues that for Strauss the American Founding Fathers were correct in their understanding of the classics in their principles of justice.

For Strauss, political community is defined by convictions about justice and happiness rather than by sovereignty and force. A classical liberal, he repudiated the philosophy of John Locke as a bridge to 20th-century historicism and nihilism and instead defended liberal democracy as closer to the spirit of the classics than other modern regimes. For Strauss, the American awareness of ineradicable evil in human nature and hence the need for morality, was a beneficial outgrowth of the pre-modern Western tradition. O'Neill (2009) notes that Strauss wrote little about American topics, but his students wrote a great deal and that Strauss's influence caused his students to reject historicism and positivism as morally relativist positions. They instead promoted a so-called Aristotelian perspective on America that produced a qualified defense of its liberal constitutionalism. Strauss's emphasis on moral clarity led the Straussians to develop an approach to international relations that Catherine and Michael Zuckert (2008) call Straussian Wilsonianism (or Straussian idealism), the defense of liberal democracy in the face of its vulnerability.

Strauss influenced The Weekly Standard editor Bill Kristol, William Bennett, Newt Gingrich, Antonin Scalia and Clarence Thomas, as well as Paul Wolfowitz.

Jeane Kirkpatrick 

A theory of neoconservative foreign policy during the final years of the Cold War was articulated by Jeane Kirkpatrick in "Dictatorships and Double Standards", published in Commentary Magazine during November 1979. Kirkpatrick criticized the foreign policy of Jimmy Carter, which endorsed détente with the Soviet Union. She later served the Reagan Administration as Ambassador to the United Nations.

Skepticism towards democracy promotion 
In "Dictatorships and Double Standards", Kirkpatrick distinguished between authoritarian regimes and the totalitarian regimes such as the Soviet Union. She suggested that in some countries democracy was not tenable and the United States had a choice between endorsing authoritarian governments, which might evolve into democracies, or Marxist–Leninist regimes, which she argued had never been ended once they achieved totalitarian control. In such tragic circumstances, she argued that allying with authoritarian governments might be prudent. Kirkpatrick argued that by demanding rapid liberalization in traditionally autocratic countries, the Carter administration had delivered those countries to Marxist–Leninists that were even more repressive. She further accused the Carter administration of a "double standard" and of never having applied its rhetoric on the necessity of liberalization to communist governments. The essay compares traditional autocracies and Communist regimes: 

Kirkpatrick concluded that while the United States should encourage liberalization and democracy in autocratic countries, it should not do so when the government risks violent overthrow and should expect gradual change rather than immediate transformation. She wrote: "No idea holds greater sway in the mind of educated Americans than the belief that it is possible to democratize governments, anytime and anywhere, under any circumstances ... Decades, if not centuries, are normally required for people to acquire the necessary disciplines and habits. In Britain, the road [to democratic government] took seven centuries to traverse. ... The speed with which armies collapse, bureaucracies abdicate, and social structures dissolve once the autocrat is removed frequently surprises American policymakers".

1990s 
During the 1990s, neoconservatives were once again opposed to the foreign policy establishment, both during the Republican Administration of President George H. W. Bush and that of his Democratic successor, President Bill Clinton. Many critics charged that the neoconservatives lost their influence as a result of the end of the Soviet Union.

After the decision of George H. W. Bush to leave Saddam Hussein in power after the first Iraq War during 1991, many neoconservatives considered this policy and the decision not to endorse indigenous dissident groups such as the Kurds and Shiites in their 1991–1992 resistance to Hussein as a betrayal of democratic principles.

Some of those same targets of criticism would later become fierce advocates of neoconservative policies. During 1992, referring to the first Iraq War, then United States Secretary of Defense and future Vice President Richard Cheney said: 

Within a few years of the Gulf War in Iraq, many neoconservatives were endorsing the ousting of Saddam Hussein. On 19 February 1998, an open letter to President Clinton was published, signed by dozens of pundits, many identified with neoconservatism and later related groups such as the Project for the New American Century, urging decisive action to remove Saddam from power.

Neoconservatives were also members of the so-called "blue team", which argued for a confrontational policy toward the People's Republic of China and strong military and diplomatic endorsement for the Republic of China (also known as Formosa or Taiwan).

During the late 1990s, Irving Kristol and other writers in neoconservative magazines began touting anti-Darwinist views as an endorsement of intelligent design. Since these neoconservatives were largely of secular origin, a few commentators have speculated that thisalong with endorsement of religion generally – may have been a case of a "noble lie", intended to protect public morality, or even tactical politics, to attract religious endorsers.

2000s

Administration of George W. Bush 
The Bush campaign and the early Bush administration did not exhibit strong endorsement of neoconservative principles. As a presidential candidate, Bush had argued for a restrained foreign policy, stating his opposition to the idea of nation-building. Also early in the administration, some neoconservatives criticized Bush's administration as insufficiently supportive of Israel and suggested Bush's foreign policies were not substantially different from those of President Clinton.

Bush's policies changed dramatically immediately after the 11 September 2001 attacks.

During Bush's State of the Union speech of January 2002, he named Iraq, Iran and North Korea as states that "constitute an axis of evil" and "pose a grave and growing danger". Bush suggested the possibility of preemptive war: "I will not wait on events, while dangers gather. I will not stand by, as peril draws closer and closer. The United States of America will not permit the world's most dangerous regimes to threaten us with the world's most destructive weapons".

Some major defense and national-security persons have been quite critical of what they believed was a neoconservative influence in getting the United States to go to war against Iraq.

Former Nebraska Republican U.S. senator and Secretary of Defense, Chuck Hagel, who has been critical of the Bush administration's adoption of neoconservative ideology, in his book America: Our Next Chapter wrote:

Bush Doctrine 

The Bush Doctrine of preemptive war was stated explicitly in the National Security Council (NSC) text "National Security Strategy of the United States". published 20 September 2002: "We must deter and defend against the threat before it is unleashed ... even if uncertainty remains as to the time and place of the enemy's attack. ... The United States will, if necessary, act preemptively".

The choice not to use the word "preventive" in the 2002 National Security Strategy and instead use the word "preemptive" was largely in anticipation of the widely perceived illegality of preventive attacks in international law via both Charter Law and Customary Law. In this context, disputes over the non-aggression principle in domestic and foreign policy, especially given the doctrine of preemption, alternatively impede and facilitate studies of the impact of libertarian precepts on neo-conservatism.

Policy analysts noted that the Bush Doctrine as stated in the 2002 NSC document had a strong resemblance to recommendations presented originally in a controversial Defense Planning Guidance draft written during 1992 by Paul Wolfowitz, during the first Bush administration.

The Bush Doctrine was greeted with accolades by many neoconservatives. When asked whether he agreed with the Bush Doctrine, Max Boot said he did and that "I think [Bush is] exactly right to say we can't sit back and wait for the next terrorist strike on Manhattan. We have to go out and stop the terrorists overseas. We have to play the role of the global policeman. ... But I also argue that we ought to go further". Discussing the significance of the Bush Doctrine, neoconservative writer Bill Kristol claimed: "The world is a mess. And, I think, it's very much to Bush's credit that he's gotten serious about dealing with it. ... The danger is not that we're going to do too much. The danger is that we're going to do too little".

2008 presidential election and aftermath 

John McCain, who was the Republican candidate for the 2008 United States presidential election, endorsed continuing the second Iraq War, "the issue that is most clearly identified with the neoconservatives". The New York Times reported further that his foreign policy views combined elements of neoconservatism and the main competing conservative opinion, pragmatism, also known as realism: 

Barack Obama campaigned for the Democratic nomination during 2008 by attacking his opponents, especially Hillary Clinton, for originally endorsing Bush's Iraq-war policies. Obama maintained a selection of prominent military officials from the Bush Administration including Robert Gates (Bush's Defense Secretary) and David Petraeus (Bush's ranking general in Iraq).

2010s and 2020s 
By 2010, U.S. forces had switched from combat to a training role in Iraq and they left in 2011. The neocons had little influence in the Obama White House, and neo-conservatives have lost much influence in the Republican party since the rise of the Tea Party Movement.

Several neoconservatives played a major role in the Stop Trump movement in 2016, in opposition to the Republican presidential candidacy of Donald Trump, due to his criticism of interventionist foreign policies, as well as their perception of him as an "authoritarian" figure. Since Trump took office, some neoconservatives have joined his administration, such as Elliott Abrams. Neoconservatives have supported the Trump administration's hawkish approach towards Iran and Venezuela, while opposing the administration's withdrawal of troops from Syria and diplomatic outreach to North Korea. Although neoconservatives have served in the Trump administration, they have been observed to have been slowly overtaken by the nascent populist and national conservative movements, and to have struggled to adapt to a changing geopolitical atmosphere. The Lincoln Project, a political action committee consisting of current and former Republicans with the purpose of defeating Trump in the 2020 United States presidential election and Republican Senate candidates in the 2020 United States Senate elections, has been described as being primarily made of neoconservative activists seeking to return the Republican party to Bush-era ideology. Although Trump was not reelected and the Republicans failed to retain a majority in the Senate, surprising success in the 2020 United States House of Representatives elections and internal conflicts led to renewed questions about the strength of neoconservatism.

Evolution of opinions

Usage and general views 
During the early 1970s, socialist Michael Harrington was one of the first to use "neoconservative" in its modern meaning. He characterized neoconservatives as former leftistswhom he derided as "socialists for Nixon"who had become more conservative. These people tended to remain endorsers of social democracy, but distinguished themselves by allying with the Nixon administration with respect to foreign policy, especially by their endorsement of the Vietnam War and opposition to the Soviet Union. They still endorsed the welfare state, but not necessarily in its contemporary form.
 Irving Kristol remarked that a neoconservative is a "", one who became more conservative after seeing the results of liberal policies. Kristol also distinguished three specific aspects of neoconservatism from previous types of conservatism: neo-conservatives had a forward-looking attitude from their liberal heritage, rather than the reactionary and dour attitude of previous conservatives; they had a meliorative attitude, proposing alternate reforms rather than simply attacking social liberal reforms; and they took philosophical ideas and ideologies very seriously.

During January 2009 at the end of President George W. Bush's second term in office, Jonathan Clarke, a senior fellow at the Carnegie Council for Ethics in International Affairs and prominent critic of Neoconservatism, proposed the following as the "main characteristics of neoconservatism": "a tendency to see the world in binary good/evil terms", a "low tolerance for diplomacy", a "readiness to use military force", an "emphasis on US unilateral action", a "disdain for multilateral organizations" and a "focus on the Middle East".

Opinions concerning foreign policy 

In foreign policy, the neoconservatives' main concern is to prevent the development of a new rival. Defense Planning Guidance, a document prepared during 1992 by Under Secretary for Defense for Policy Paul Wolfowitz, is regarded by Distinguished Professor of the Humanities John McGowan at the University of North Carolina as the "quintessential statement of neoconservative thought". The report says: Our first objective is to prevent the re-emergence of a new rival, either on the territory of the former Soviet Union or elsewhere, that poses a threat on the order of that posed formerly by the Soviet Union. This is a dominant consideration underlying the new regional defense strategy and requires that we endeavor to prevent any hostile power from dominating a region whose resources would, under consolidated control, be sufficient to generate global power.

According to Lead Editor of e-International Relations Stephen McGlinchey: "Neo-conservatism is something of a chimera in modern politics. For its opponents it is a distinct political ideology that emphasizes the blending of military power with Wilsonian idealism, yet for its supporters it is more of a 'persuasion' that individuals of many types drift into and out of. Regardless of which is more correct, it is now widely accepted that the neo-conservative impulse has been visible in modern American foreign policy and that it has left a distinct impact".

Neoconservatives claim the "conviction that communism was a monstrous evil and a potent danger". After 1996, many self-identified "neocons" endorsed ending the welfare state "as we know it," but did not advocate for its removal. The Project for a New American Century (see below) and its petitions to the Clinton Administration proved instrumental in prompting Operation Desert Fox, although the Clinton Doctrine's concluding iteration of what became a National Security Strategy proved pivotal as well. The "social welfare" associated with neoconservative ideas has been critiqued as a revival of social imperialism, particularly in the contexts of overseas assets, security interests, oil, oil technologies, and the doctrine of preemption. Disputes over the non-aggression principle in domestic and foreign policy, especially given the doctrine of preemption (related to, but distinct from, deterrence), impede and facilitate studies of the impact of libertarian precepts on neoconservatism. In a similar vein, disparate neoconservative conceptions of "social welfare" in foreign policy, or lack thereof, collided during the prolonged deployment in Iraq. 

Neoconservative factionalism engulfed U.S. and world print cultures, most notably in a series of articles by Francis Fukuyama (Stanford University) and unitary executive theory statements by litigators such as John Yoo (UC Berkeley). Statements by Wolfowitz and additional members of the George W. Bush Administration revealed persistent disagreements as well. In 2004, for instance, Colin Powell announced in the January–February Foreign Affairs that "pundits claim that U.S. foreign policy is too focused on unilateral preemption. But George W. Bush's vision---enshrined in his 2002 National Security Strategy---is far broader and deeper than that. The president has promoted bold and effective policies to combat terrorism, intervened decisively to prevent regional conflicts, and embraced other major powers such as Russia, China, and India. Above all, he has committed the United States to a strategy of partnerships, which affirms the vital role of international alliances while advancing American interests and principles." Powell reiterated that pundits "exaggerated the centrality of preemption in U.S. strategy...the breadth of U.S. strategy transcends the war on terrorism." Powell resigned as Secretary of State later that year. In a 2012 interview with CNN's Wolf Blitzer, former Secretary of State Colin Powell revised his position on “gay marriage.” Up until that year, Powell had only publicly endorsed one Democratic Party candidate, Barack Obama, for President of the United States. Pundits subsequently interpreted Powell's shift as a neoconservative dialectic and another example of Republican Party control of television news channels. Yet he went on to publicly endorse Hillary Clinton, and, at the end of his life, Joe Biden, without publicly registering for any political party. Powell also supported federal review of "Don't ask, don't tell" policy, confessing that "attitudes and circumstances have changed" since his previous opposition to "gays in the military." Powell never protested his name listed among "allies" of same-sex marriage until his death, yet he stopped short at explicit endorsement of the repeal process for "Don't ask, don't tell."

Neoconservatism first developed during the late 1960s as an effort to oppose the radical cultural changes occurring within the United States. Irving Kristol wrote: "If there is any one thing that neoconservatives are unanimous about, it is their dislike of the counterculture". Norman Podhoretz agreed: "Revulsion against the counterculture accounted for more converts to neoconservatism than any other single factor". Neoconservatives began to emphasize foreign issues during the mid-1970s.

In 1979, an early study by liberal Peter Steinfels concentrated on the ideas of Irving Kristol, Daniel Patrick Moynihan and Daniel Bell. He noted that the stress on foreign affairs "emerged after the New Left and the counterculture had dissolved as convincing foils for neoconservatism ... The essential source of their anxiety is not military or geopolitical or to be found overseas at all; it is domestic and cultural and ideological".

Neoconservative foreign policy is a descendant of so-called Wilsonian idealism. Neoconservatives endorse democracy promotion by the U.S. and other democracies, based on the claim that they think that human rights belong to everyone. They criticized the United Nations and détente with the Soviet Union. On domestic policy, they endorse reductions in the welfare state, like European and Canadian conservatives. According to Norman Podhoretz, "'the neo-conservatives dissociated themselves from the wholesale opposition to the welfare state which had marked American conservatism since the days of the New Deal' and ... while neoconservatives supported 'setting certain limits' to the welfare state, those limits did not involve 'issues of principle, such as the legitimate size and role of the central government in the American constitutional order' but were to be 'determined by practical considerations'".

In April 2006, Robert Kagan wrote in The Washington Post that Russia and China may be the greatest "challenge liberalism faces today": 

In July 2008, Joe Klein wrote in Time that today's neoconservatives are more interested in confronting enemies than in cultivating friends. He questioned the sincerity of neoconservative interest in exporting democracy and freedom, saying: "Neoconservatism in foreign policy is best described as unilateral bellicosity cloaked in the utopian rhetoric of freedom and democracy" as well as social welfare policy.

In February 2009, Andrew Sullivan wrote he no longer took neoconservatism seriously because its basic tenet was defense of Israel:

Views on economics 
While neoconservatism is concerned primarily with foreign policy, there is also some discussion of internal economic policies. Neoconservatism generally endorses free markets and capitalism, favoring supply-side economics, but it has several disagreements with classical liberalism and fiscal conservatism. Irving Kristol states that neocons are more relaxed about budget deficits and tend to reject the Hayekian notion that the growth of government influence on society and public welfare is "the road to serfdom". Indeed, to safeguard democracy, government intervention and budget deficits may sometimes be necessary, Kristol argues. After the so-called "reconciliation with capitalism," self-identified "neoconservatives" frequently favored a reduced welfare state, but not its elimination.

Neoconservative ideology stresses that while free markets do provide material goods in an efficient way, they lack the moral guidance human beings need to fulfill their needs. They say that morality can be found only in tradition and that markets do pose questions that cannot be solved solely by economics, arguing: "So, as the economy only makes up part of our lives, it must not be allowed to take over and entirely dictate to our society". Critics consider neoconservatism a bellicose and "heroic" ideology opposed to "mercantile" and "bourgeois" virtues and therefore "a variant of anti-economic thought". Political scientist Zeev Sternhell states: "Neoconservatism has succeeded in convincing the great majority of Americans that the main questions that concern a society are not economic, and that social questions are really moral questions".

Views on gender roles 
Neoconservatives support a restoration of traditional gender roles and a strengthening of "traditional families" in order to adapt social structures to the free capitalism they demand. The nuclear family is supposed to be an alternative to the welfare state, so that cuts to health care, education and social welfare budgets can be legitimized.

Friction with other conservatives 
Many conservatives oppose neoconservative policies and have critical views on it. Disputes over the non-aggression principle in domestic and foreign policy, especially given the doctrine of preemption, can impede (and facilitate) studies of the impact of libertarian precepts on neo-conservatism, but that of course didn't, and still doesn't, stop pundits from publishing appraisals. For example, Stefan Halper and Jonathan Clarke (a libertarian based at Cato), in their 2004 book on neoconservatism, America Alone: The Neo-Conservatives and the Global Order, characterized the neoconservatives at that time as uniting around three common themes:

Responding to a question about neoconservatives in 2004, William F. Buckley Jr. said: "I think those I know, which is most of them, are bright, informed and idealistic, but that they simply overrate the reach of U.S. power and influence".

Friction with paleoconservatism 

Starting during the 1980s, disputes concerning Israel and public policy contributed to a conflict with paleoconservatives. Pat Buchanan terms neoconservatism "a globalist, interventionist, open borders ideology". Paul Gottfried has written that the neocons' call for "permanent revolution" exists independently of their beliefs about Israel, characterizing the neoconservatives  as "ranters out of a Dostoyevskian novel, who are out to practice permanent revolution courtesy of the U.S. government" and questioning how anyone could mistake them for conservatives. What make neocons most dangerous are not their isolated ghetto hang-ups, like hating Germans and Southern whites and calling everyone and his cousin an anti-Semite, but the leftist revolutionary fury they express.He has also argued that domestic equality and the exportability of democracy are points of contention between them.

Paul Craig Roberts, United States Assistant Secretary of the Treasury for Economic Policy during the Reagan administration and associated with paleoconservatism stated in 2003 that "there is nothing conservative about neoconservatives. Neocons hide behind 'conservative' but they are in fact Jacobins. Jacobins were the 18th century French revolutionaries whose intention to remake  Europe in revolutionary France's image launched the Napoleonic Wars".

Trotskyism allegation 
Critics have argued that since the founders of neo-conservatism included ex-Trotskyists, Trotskyist traits continue to characterize neo-conservative ideologies and practices. During the Reagan administration, the charge was made that the foreign policy of the Reagan administration was being managed by ex-Trotskyists. This "Trotskyist" charge was repeated and widened by journalist Michael Lind during 2003 to assert a takeover of the foreign policy of the George W. Bush administration by former Trotskyists; Lind's "amalgamation of the defense intellectuals with the traditions and theories of 'the largely Jewish-American Trotskyist movement' [in Lind's words]" was criticized during 2003 by University of Michigan professor Alan M. Wald, who had discussed Trotskyism  in his history of "the New York intellectuals".

The charge that neoconservativism is related to Leninism has also been made by Francis Fukuyama. He argued that both believe in the "existence of a long-term process of social evolution", though neoconservatives seek to establish liberal democracy instead of communism. He wrote that neoconservatives "believed that history can be pushed along with the right application of power and will. Leninism was a tragedy in its Bolshevik version, and it has returned as farce when practiced by the United States. Neoconservatism, as both a political symbol and a body of thought, has evolved into something I can no longer support". However, these comparisons ignore anti-capitalist and anti-imperialist positions central to Leninism, which run contradictory to core neoconservative beliefs.

Criticism 
Critics of neoconservatism take issue with neoconservatives' support for interventionistic foreign policy. Critics from the left take issue with what they characterize as unilateralism and lack of concern with international consensus through organizations such as the United Nations.

Critics from both the left and right have assailed neoconservatives for the role Israel plays in their policies on the Middle East.

Neoconservatives respond by describing their shared opinion as a belief that national security is best attained by actively promoting freedom and democracy abroad as in the democratic peace theory through the endorsement of democracy, foreign aid and in certain cases military intervention. This is different from the traditional conservative tendency to endorse friendly regimes in matters of trade and anti-communism even at the expense of undermining existing democratic systems.

Former Republican Congressman Ron Paul (now a Libertarian politician) has been a longtime critic of neoconservativism as an attack on freedom and the Constitution, including an extensive speech on the House floor addressing neoconservative beginnings and how neoconservatism is neither new nor conservative.

In a column on The New York Times named "Years of Shame" commemorating the tenth anniversary of 9/11 attacks, Paul Krugman criticized the neoconservatives for causing a war unrelated to 9/11 attacks and fought for wrong reasons.

Imperialism and secrecy 

John McGowan, professor of humanities at the University of North Carolina, states after an extensive review of neoconservative literature and theory that neoconservatives are attempting to build an American Empire, seen as successor to the British Empire, its goal being to perpetuate a "Pax Americana". As imperialism is largely considered unacceptable by the American media, neoconservatives do not articulate their ideas and goals in a frank manner in public discourse. McGowan states:

Notable people associated with neoconservatism 
The list includes public people identified as personally neoconservative at an important time or a high official with numerous neoconservative advisers, such as George W. Bush and Dick Cheney.

Politicians 

 George W. Bush – 43rd U.S. President, 46th U.S. Governor of Texas
 Jeb Bush – 43rd U.S. Governor of Florida, 2016 Republican presidential candidate
 Dick Cheney – 46th U.S. Vice President, former White House Chief of Staff, former U.S. Representative from Wyoming, former U.S. Secretary of Defense - described as a practitioner of neoconservative foreign policy or allied with neoconservatives but not one himself, and without a historical background in the ideological neoconservative movement
Liz Cheney – former U.S. Representative for Wyoming's at-large district.
 Chris Christie – 56th Governor of New Jersey, former United States Attorney for the District of New Jersey, 2016 Republican presidential candidate; though he rejects the term
 Tom Cotton – U.S. Senator from Arkansas, former U.S. Representative from Arkansas
 Lindsey Graham – U.S. Senator from South Carolina, former United States Air Force Colonel, former U.S. Representative from South Carolina, 2016 Republican presidential candidate
 John McCain – former U.S. Representative & U.S. Senator from Arizona, 2000 Republican presidential candidate, 2008 Republican presidential nominee
 Mitch McConnell – U.S. Senator from Kentucky, Senate Minority Leader, former Senate Majority Whip, former Senate Majority Leader
 Mike Pompeo – former U.S. Representative for Kansas’s 4th district, 6th Director of the Central Intelligence Agency, 70th U.S. Secretary of State.
 Marco Rubio – U.S. Senator from Florida, 2016 Republican presidential candidate
Mike Turner - U.S. representative for  since 2003
Michael McCaul - U.S. representative for  since 2005
Adam Kinzinger - U.S. representative for  since 2011
Dan Crenshaw - U.S. representative for  since 2019

Government officials 

 Elliot Abrams – foreign policy advisor
 Kenneth Adelman – former Director of Arms Control and Disarmament Agency
 William Bennett – former chairman of the National Endowment for the Humanities, former Director of the National Drug Control Policy and former U.S. Secretary of Education
 John R. Bolton – former Ambassador to the United Nations, and former National Security Advisor; though he rejects the term
 Eliot A. Cohen – former State Department Counselor, now Robert E. Osgood Professor of Strategic Studies at the Paul H. Nitze School of Advanced International Studies at the Johns Hopkins University
 Douglas J. Feith – former Under Secretary of Defense for Policy
 Frank Gaffney – former Acting Assistant Secretary of Defense for International Security Affairs, founder and president of the Center for Security Policy
 Jeane Kirkpatrick – former Ambassador to the United Nations under Ronald Reagan
 Bill Kristol – former Chief of Staff to the Vice President of the United States, co-founder and former editor of The Weekly Standard, professor of political philosophy and American politics and political adviser
 Scooter Libby – former Chief of Staff to the Vice President of the United States
 Richard Perle – former Assistant Secretary of Defense and lobbyist
 Randy Scheunemann – foreign policy advisor and lobbyist
 Paul Wolfowitz – former State and Defense Department official
 R. James Woolsey Jr. – former Undersecretary of the Navy, former Director of Central Intelligence, green energy lobbyist

Academics 
 Nathan Glazer – Professor of sociology at UC Berkeley and Harvard, columnist and author.
 Donald Kagan – Sterling Professor of Classics and History at Yale University.
 Andrew Roberts – Professor of History at King's College in London.

Public figures 

 Fred Barnes – co-founder and former executive editor of The Weekly Standard
 Max Boot – author, consultant, editorialist, lecturer, and military historian; though wishes to retire label
 David Brooks – Columnist
 Midge Decter – journalist, author
Dinesh D'Souza– filmmaker and author
David Frum – journalist, Republican speechwriter and columnist
 Reuel Marc Gerecht – writer, political analyst and senior fellow at the Foundation for Defense of Democracies
 Bruce P. Jackson – activist, former U.S. military intelligence officer
 Frederick Kagan – historian, resident scholar at the American Enterprise Institute
 Robert Kagan – senior fellow at the Brookings Institution, scholar of U.S. foreign policy, founder of the Yale Political Monthly, adviser to Republican political campaigns and one of 25 members of an advisory board to Hillary Clinton at the State Department (Kagan calls himself a "liberal interventionist" rather than "neoconservative")
 Charles Krauthammer – Pulitzer Prize winner, columnist and psychiatrist
 Irving Kristol – publisher, journalist, columnist and former Marxist
 Eli Lake – journalist and columnist
 Michael Ledeen – historian, foreign policy analyst, scholar at the American Enterprise Institute
 Clifford May – founder and president of the Foundation for Defense of Democracies
 Douglas Murray – British writer, journalist and political commentator
 Danielle Pletka – American Enterprise Institute vice president
 Norman Podhoretz – editor-in-chief of Commentary
Yuval Levin – founding editor of National Affairs (2009–present) and director of Social, Cultural, and Constitutional Studies at the American Enterprise Institute.
 Tom Rogan – journalist and political analyst
 Jennifer Rubin – (former neoconservative) journalist and political analyst
 Michael Rubin – resident scholar at the American Enterprise Institute
 Gary Schmitt – resident scholar at the American Enterprise Institute
 Ben Shapiro – political commentator, public speaker, author, lawyer, founder and editor emeritus of The Daily Wire.
 Bret Stephens – journalist and columnist for The New York Times
 Irwin Stelzer – economist and writer

Related publications and institutions

Institutions 
 American Enterprise Institute
 Foundation for Defense of Democracies
 Henry Jackson Society
 Hudson Institute
 Project for the New American Century

Publications 
 Commentary;
 National Review (neoconservative opinion pieces);
 The Washington Free Beacon;
 The Bulwark;

Defunct publications 
 The Public Interest (1965-2005);
 The Weekly Standard (1995-2018);

See also 

 British neoconservatism
 Democratic peace theory
 Factions in the Republican Party (United States)
 Globalization
 Intellectual dark web
 Interventionism (politics)
 Liberal conservatism
 Liberal hawk
 Liberal internationalism
 Neoconservatism and paleoconservatism
 Neoconservatism in Japan
 Neoconservatism in the Czech Republic
 New Conservatism (China)
 Neoliberalism
 Neo-libertarianism
 New Right in the United States
 Paleoconservatism
 Project for a New American Century
 Tory socialism
 Trotskyism

Notes

References 

 Albanese, Matteo. The Concept of War in Neoconservative Thinking, IPOC, Milan, 2012. Translated by Nicolas Lewkowicz. 
 Buchanan, Patrick J. "Whose War", The American Conservative, 24 March 2003. Retrieved 16 September 2006.
 Bush, George W., Gerhard Schroeder, et al., "Transcript: Bush, Schroeder Roundtable With German Professionals", The Washington Post, 23 February 2005. Retrieved 16 September 2006.
 Critchlow, Donald T. The conservative ascendancy: how the GOP right made political history (2nd ed., 2011)
 Dean, John. Worse Than Watergate: The Secret Presidency of George W. Bush, Little, Brown, 2004.  (hardback). Critical account of neo-conservatism in the administration of George W. Bush.
 Frum, David. "Unpatriotic Conservatives", National Review, 7 April 2003. Retrieved 16 September 2006.
 Gerson, Mark, ed. The Essential Neo-Conservative Reader, Perseus, 1997.  (paperback),  (hardback).
 Gerson, Mark. "Norman's Conquest: A Commentary on the Podhoretz Legacy", Policy Review, Fall 1995, Number 74. Retrieved 16 September 2006.
 Gray, John. Black Mass, Allen Lane, 2007. .
 Hanson, Jim The Decline of the American Empire, Praeger, 1993. .
 Halper, Stefan and Jonathan Clarke. America Alone: The Neo-Conservatives and the Global Order, Cambridge University Press, 2004. .
 Kagan, Robert, et al., Present Dangers: Crisis and Opportunity in American Foreign and Defense Policy. Encounter Books, 2000. .
 Kristol, Irving. Neo-Conservatism: The Autobiography of an Idea: Selected Essays 1949-1995, New York: The Free Press, 1995.  (10).  (13). (Hardcover ed.) Reprinted as Neoconservatism: The Autobiography of an Idea, New York: Ivan R. Dee, 1999.  (10). (Paperback ed.)
 Kristol, Irving. "What Is a Neoconservative?", Newsweek, 19 January 1976.
 Lara Amat y León, Joan y Antón Mellón, Joan, "Las persuasiones neoconservadoras: F. Fukuyama, S. P. Huntington, W. Kristol y R. Kagan", en Máiz, Ramón (comp.), Teorías políticas contemporáneas, (2ªed.rev. y ampl.) Tirant lo Blanch, Valencia, 2009. . Ficha del libro
 Lara Amat y León, Joan, "Cosmopolitismo y anticosmoplitismo en el neoconservadurismo: Fukuyama y Huntington", en Nuñez, Paloma y Espinosa, Javier (eds.), Filosofía y política en el siglo XXI. Europa y el nuevo orden cosmopolita, Akal, Madrid, 2009. . Ficha del libro
 Lasn, Kalle. "Why won't anyone say they are Jewish?", Adbusters, March/April 2004. Retrieved 16 September 2006.
 Lewkowicz, Nicolas. "Neoconservatism and the Propagation of Democracy", Democracy Chronicles, 11 February 2013.
 
 Mann, James. Rise of the Vulcans: The History of Bush's War Cabinet, Viking, 2004.  (cloth).
 
 Mascolo, Georg. "A Leaderless, Directionless Superpower: interview with Ex-Powell aide Wilkerson" , Spiegel Online, 6 December 2005. Retrieved 16 September 2006.
 Muravchik, Joshua. "Renegades", Commentary, 1 October 2002. Bibliographical information is available online, the article itself is not.
 Muravchik, Joshua. "The Neoconservative Cabal", Commentary, September 2003. Bibliographical information is available online, the article itself is not.
 Prueher, Joseph. U.S. apology to China over spy plane incident, 11 April 2001. Reproduced on sinomania.com. Retrieved 16 September 2006.
 Podoretz, Norman. The Norman Podhoretz Reader. New York: Free Press, 2004. .
 Roucaute Yves. Le Neoconservatisme est un humanisme. Paris: Presses Universitaires de France, 2005..
 Roucaute Yves. La Puissance de la Liberté. Paris: Presses Universitaires de France, 2004..
 Ruppert, Michael C.. Crossing the Rubicon: The Decline of the American Empire at the End of the Age of Oil, New Society, 2004. .
 Ryn, Claes G., America the Virtuous: The Crisis of Democracy and the Quest for Empire, Transaction, 2003.  (cloth).
 Stelzer, Irwin, ed. Neoconservatism, Atlantic Books, 2004.
 Smith, Grant F. Deadly Dogma: How Neoconservatives Broke the Law to Deceive America. .
 Solarz, Stephen, et al. "Open Letter to the President", 19 February 1998, online at IraqWatch.org. Retrieved 16 September 2006.
 
 Strauss, Leo. Natural Right and History, University of Chicago Press, 1999. .
 Strauss, Leo. The Rebirth of Classical Political Rationalism, University of Chicago Press, 1989. .
 Tolson, Jay. "The New American Empire?", U.S. News & World Report, 13 January 2003. Retrieved 16 September 2006.
 Wilson, Joseph. The Politics of Truth. Carroll & Graf, 2004. .
 Woodward, Bob. Plan of Attack, Simon and Schuster, 2004. .

Further reading 
 Arin, Kubilay Yado: Think Tanks: The Brain Trusts of US Foreign Policy. Wiesbaden: VS Springer 2013.
 Balint, Benjamin V. Running Commentary: The Contentious Magazine that Transformed the Jewish Left into the Neoconservative Right (2010).
 Dorrien, Gary. The Neoconservative Mind. , n attack from the Left.
 Ehrman, John. The Rise of Neoconservatism: Intellectual and Foreign Affairs 1945 – 1994, Yale University Press, 2005, .
 Eisendrath, Craig R. and Melvin A. Goodman. Bush League Diplomacy: How the Neoconservatives are Putting The World at Risk (Prometheus Books, 2004), .
 Franczak, Michael. 2019. "Losing the Battle, Winning the War: Neoconservatives versus the New International Economic Order, 1974–82."Diplomatic History
 Friedman, Murray. The Neoconservative Revolution: Jewish Intellectuals and the Shaping of Public Policy. Cambridge University Press, 2006. .
 Grandin, Greg."Empire's Workshop: Latin America, the United States, and the Rise of the New Imperialism." Metropolitan Books Henry Holt & Company, 2006..
 Heilbrunn, Jacob. They Knew They Were Right: The Rise of the Neocons, Doubleday (2008) .
 Heilbrunn, Jacob. "5 Myths About Those Nefarious Neocons", The Washington Post, 10 February 2008.
 Kristol, Irving. "The Neoconservative Persuasion".
 Lind, Michael. "How Neoconservatives Conquered Washington", Salon, 9 April 2003.
 MacDonald, Kevin. "The Neoconservative Mind", review of They Knew They Were Right: The Rise of the Neocons by Jacob Heilbrunn.
 Vaïsse, Justin. Neoconservatism: The Biography of a Movement (Harvard U.P. 2010), translated from the French.
 McClelland, Mark, The unbridling of virtue: neoconservatism between the Cold War and the Iraq War.
 Shavit, Ari, "White Man's Burden", Haaretz, 3 April 2003.
 Singh, Robert. "Neoconservatism in the age of Obama." in Inderjeet Parmar, ed., Obama and the World (Routledge, 2014). 51–62. online

Identity 
 "Neocon 101: What do neoconservatives believe?", Christian Science Monitor, 2003
 Rose, David, "Neo Culpa", Vanity Fair, 2006
 Steigerwald, Bill. "So, what is a 'Neocon'?".
 Lind, Michael, "A Tragedy of Errors".

Critiques 
 Fukuyama, Francis. "After Neoconservatism", The New York Times, 2006.
 Thompson, Bradley C. (with Yaron Brook). Neoconservatism. An Obituary for an Idea. Boulder/London: Paradigm Publishers, 2010. .

External links

Adam Curtis, The Power of Nightmares, BBC. Archive.
"Why Neoconservatism Still Matters" by Justin Vaïsse
"Neoconservativism in a Nutshell" by Jim Lobe
The Rise and Demise of American Unipolarism: Neoconservatism and U.S. Foreign Policy 1989–2009 by Maria Ryan

 
Neoconservatism
Neoconservatism
History of United States expansionism

Neoconservatism
Political ideologies